Emmanuel "Manu" Cornet (born 21 January 1981) is a French programmer, cartoonist, writer and musician. Born in Paris, he studied at the École alsacienne and at the École normale supérieure. Cornet worked at Google from 2007 until 2021.

Career
Cornet worked at Google from 2007 until 2021. He joined Twitter in 2021, but said he had been laid off in 2022 shortly after Elon Musk's takeover of the company.

Cartoonist
Cornet is known for his cartoons, some of which were published in The New York Times, Der Spiegel, Mashable, Daring Fireball and Business Insider. 

His "Organizational Charts" cartoon was quoted by Satya Nadella on the first page of his 2017 book, Hit Refresh, as one of the motivations making him want to renew Microsoft's culture.

Writer
Cornet wrote The Crab and the Lamb, edited by Geneviève Jurgensen and translated into English by Adriana Hunter. It is the first-person account of Cornet's experience with cancer diagnosis and treatment.

His second book, Goomics, was published in 2018. It is about his experiences working for Google.

Publications

References

French musicians
1981 births
Writers from Paris
École Normale Supérieure alumni
Google people
Musicians from Paris
Living people
French cartoonists
French male writers
Twitter, Inc. people